Hygroplasta canitiana is a moth in the family Lecithoceridae. It was described by Chun-Sheng Wu and Kyu-Tek Park in 1998. It is found in Sri Lanka.

The wingspan is 13–15 mm. The forewings are ochreous grey, with a silky sheen. There are two dark brown discal spots at the middle and the end of the cell. The hindwings are grey.

Etymology
The species name is derived from Latin canitia (meaning grey).

References

Moths described in 1998
Hygroplasta